Florian Janistyn (born 22 April 1988) is an Austrian swimmer, who specializes in long-distance freestyle events. He is a two-time Austrian national record holder in both 800 and 1500 m freestyle, and also, a current member of SG Wiener Neustadt, under his personal coach Erich Neulinger.

Janistyn made his first Austrian team at the 2008 Summer Olympics in Beijing, swimming in both long-distance freestyle and freestyle relay team events. He swam on the second leg of the men's 4 × 200 m freestyle relay, posting a split time of 1:50.48. Janistyn and his teammates Dominik Koll, Markus Rogan, and David Brandl finished heat two in fifth place and ninth overall, with a total time of 7:11.45. Three days later, Janistyn won the first heat of his only individual event, the 1500 m freestyle, by sixteen seconds ahead of Bulgarian swimmer and three-time Olympian Petar Stoychev, with a new Austrian record time of 15:12.46. Janistyn, however, failed to advance into the final, as he placed twenty-first out of 37 swimmers in the evening's preliminaries.

Four years after competing in his first Olympics, Janistyn only qualified for the men's 4 × 200 m freestyle relay at the 2012 Summer Olympics in London. Swimming the anchor leg, Janistyn recorded a split time of 1:51.37, and the Austrian team (composed of Rogan, Brandl, and Christian Scherübl) went on to finish in eighth place and sixteenth overall, for a total time of 7:17.94.

References

External links
NBC Olympics Profile

1988 births
Living people
Austrian male freestyle swimmers
Olympic swimmers of Austria
Swimmers at the 2008 Summer Olympics
Swimmers at the 2012 Summer Olympics
Swimmers from Vienna